Making Love - A conspiracy of the Heart is a comic novel by Marius Brill first published in 2003 by Doubleday in the UK.  The book was among the topics for discussion at a session on comedy writing featuring Brill at the 2008 Henley Literary Festival on 20 September (https://web.archive.org/web/20081120175914/http://www.henleyliteraryfestival.co.uk/programme2.html).

External links
Review in The Independent

References 

2003 novels
British comedy novels
Doubleday (publisher) books